The 2013 Ghana Movie Awards was held at the Accra International Conference Center on 30 December 2013. A Northern Affair and Contract were the top winners for the night.

Awards

Category
 Best Original Score
Ivan Ayitey - Contract
Berni Anti – House of Gold
Shaun Burdick - A Northern Affair

 Best Writing (Adapted or Original Screenplay)
 Contract – Herty Owusu and Shirley Frimpong-Manso House of Gold - Pascal Amanfo
 A Northern Affair – Leila Djansi
 The Pledge – Benjamin Dwomoh
 Cheaters - Frank Rajah Arase

 Best Production Design
 Okomfo Anokye - Brinks Abdullai and Bismark Gyamerah
 The Pledge - D.j Vegas/Ghana Armed Forces A Northern Affair -Tony Tomety/Palm Gottfried
 Contract - Shirley Frimpong-Manso & Ken Attoh
 House of Gold - Pascal Amanfo

 Best Editing
 A Northern Affair - Dave Goldberg Contract - Nana Akua Manso
 Nkuli - Afra Marley
 House of Gold - Okey Benson
 The Hunters - Enoch Opoku

 Best Music (Original Song)
Kobby Maxwell - One Night in Vegas
Abena Fosua - Okomfo Anokye
Berni Anti and Mercy Chinwo - House of GoldJon Germain and Kofi Aykeame A Northern Affair
Raquel for Contract

 Best Makeup & Hair Stylist
 Barima Nye Sunye - Jude Odeh Purple Rose - Lydia Ashietey
 The Price - Foreal Mensah
 House of Gold - Joyce Mensah

 Best African Collaboration - Best Actor
 Contract - Hlomla Dandala Number one Fan - Yemi Blaq
 Finding Mercy - Desmond Elliot
 House of Gold - Francis Odega Volunteers – Bobby Obodo

 Best African Collaboration - Best Actress
Purple Rose - Nse Ikpe Etim
Finding Mercy - Rita Dominic
House of Gold - Omawumi Megbele
 Volunteers - Ivie Okujaye
 Slave Boy - Patience Ozokwor Best Sound Mixing & Editing
Contract – Mawuli Tofah
House of Gold - Berni AntiA Northern Affair - Shaun Burdick'One Night in Vegas - Black Tim

 Best Actor in a Supporting Role
 Kwadwo Nkansah (lilwin) - Time Changes Henry Adofo Asiedu - House of Gold
 Jon Germain – A Northern Affair
 Van Vicker - One Night in Vegas
 Edward Agyekum Kufuor – The Pledge

 Best Actress in a Supporting Role
Lydia Forson - Volunteers
Lisa Nana Yaa Awuku - Nkuli
Rose Mensah (Kyeiwaa) - Time Changes
Roselyn Ngissah - The PledgeJoselyn Canfor Dumas - A Northern Affair Best Actor in a Leading RoleJohn Dumelo - A Northern AffairKofi Adu (Agya Koo) - Okomfo Anokye
Adjetey Anang - The Hunters
James Gardiner - Nkuli
Majid Michel - The Price

 Best Actress in a Leading RoleJackie Appiah - CheatersYvonne Okoro - Contract
Maame Serwaa - School Girl
Yvonne Nelson - The Price
Sonia Ibrahim - Number one Fan

 Best Short Film
Campus scandalsGalamseyHospitals

 Best Picture
 A Northern Affair'''
 Contract HunterHouse of GoldOne Night in VegasNumber one fanPurple RoseThe PledgeFinding MercyOkomfo AnokyeSpecial Awards
 Monalisa Magazine Award for Best MovieHeartbreak Hotel Monalisa Magazine Awards for Best Actor in a SeriesFunny FaceMonalisa Magazine Awards for Best Actress in a SeriesEsi of Chorkor TrortroorGlitz Magazine’s Favourite Actor
John Dumelo - A Northern AffairGlitz Magazine’s Favourite Actor
Jackie Appiah - Cheaters''

Glitz Magazine’s Fan’s Favourite Actor
Prince David Osei

Glitz Magazine’s Fan’s Favourite Actress
Yvonne Nelson

References

Ghana Movie Awards
Ghana
2013 in Ghana